Veraval, also known as Somnath, is a municipality and the headquarters of Gir Somnath district in the Indian state of Gujarat. It is also known for the hub of fishing industries in India.

Geography

It has an average elevation of 0 metres (0 feet).

History 

Veraval was founded in 13th or 14th century by Rao Veravalji Vadher, a Rajput. Present name is believed to be derived from its old name "Velakul" meaning Port City. Veraval was once a fortified port town of the royal family of Junagadh. It was a part of the Kingdom of Junagadh till 1947 when Junagadh was merged with India. The city still bears some remnants of the old Nawabi heritage, the Nawabi summer palace being among them. There are ruins of the old Nawabi fort and Nawabi Gates in and around the place. The old walls of the port are now ruined, but the impressive Junagadh gate and the Patan gate are still seen, but are in a very bad state.

The Nawabi Palace with Gothic features which is one of the main attractions. It is popularly known as Somnath College (the palace was converted into a college after it was abandoned by the Nawab). At present it is the building of a Sanskrit university. The town is often known as the gateway to the magnificent temple of Somnath and the pilgrimage centres of Prabhas Patan and Bhalkha. Veraval is also the nearest town to the Gir National Park (42 km away).

Before the rise of Surat, Veraval was the major seaport for pilgrims to Mecca. Its importance now is as a fishing port, one of the largest in India. Seafaring dhows and wooden fishing boats are still built by the fishermen without the use of any modern technology. Traditional skills are passed down from father to son.

On 30 March 2021, Veraval - Patan Joint Municipality passed a resolution to change its name from Veraval - Patan Joint Municipality to Somnath Municipality. The final decision will be taken by Home Ministry of India.

Demographics

As of the 2011 India census, Veraval had a population of 153,696. Males constitute 51% of the population and females 49%. Veraval has an average literacy rate of 62%, higher than the national average of 59.5%: male literacy is 71%, and female literacy is 53%. In Veraval, 14% of the population is under 6 years of age.

Climate
Veraval has a borderline hot semi-arid (Köppen BSh)/tropical savanna (Aw) climate with very warm to hot temperatures throughout the year. Almost all rainfall occurs during the summer monsoon season from June to September.

People 
Veraval has a predominant Gujarati population. Amongst Gujaratis, Karadiya Rajput, Kumbhar Samaj (Prajapati), Jains (Oswal), the Soni (Jewellers, mainly from the clans of Dhakan, Patt, Sagar, etc.), Kharwa, Ahir  (Schedule Cast) brahma samaj and the Kolis  Patni Jamat, Rajwadi bhois, Hadi, Lohanas, Maleks, Memons,  and Raykas. There is also a sizable population Sindhis.
Gujarati and Hindi are the most common languages in the town. Migratory people from other parts of the country also hold a good amount of population in the city.

Industry 

Fisheries have always been the main industries in the town and are dominated by the Kharwas (fisherfolk). The fishing is done mostly on traditional boats and trawlers. Veraval also has a large boat making industry. Veraval is home to a large number of fish processing factories in GIDC (Gujarat Industrial Development Corporation)  which export prime quality seafood to USA, Japan, SE Asian, Gulf and EU Countries. The seafood-industry which was started through government initiative now is in its prime and many importers are attracted towards Veraval from around the globe. Regional research centers of CIFT and CMFRI situated at Veraval have done Yeoman service in development of fisheries sector in Gujarat.

Veraval also is home to Grasim Industries limited (Unit - Indian Rayon) which is one of India's largest rayon manufacturing companies.

There are various chemical, thread and cement companies around Veraval which provide employment to the local youth. The major ones being Indian Rayon Unit of Grasim industries limited, Gujarat Ambuja Cement Ltd, Gujarat Siddhee Cement Ltd and Gujarat Heavy Chemicals Ltd.

Patni Jamat, a local inhabitants have flourished as main seafood exporter after the 1990s. They have a very good hold on the fishing business.

Transport 

The city has two railway stations namely Veraval Junction and Somnath.  is a fairly busy railway junction station for Western Railways and is served by more than 14 pairs of regional and long-distance trains.

Daily (or multiple daily) trains connect it to major cities in Gujarat such as Ahmedabad, Bharuch, Jamnagar, Junagadh, Porbandar, Rajkot, Surat and Vadodara.

Daily connections are also available to many other towns in Gujarat such as Keshod, Jetalsar, Gondal, Wankaner, Surendranagar, Viramgam, Nadiad, Anand, Valsad, Vapi, Dahod and Godhra.

Daily long distance trains connect Veraval to several cities in India including Bhopal, Jabalpur, Itarsi, Ratlam, Ujjain, Indore and Mumbai.

Pune, Trivandrum, Kochi, Kollam, Kottayam, Thrissur, Kozhikode, Kannur, Mangalore, Karwar, Madgaon, Ratnagiri and Panvel are some of the cities connected by weekly long distance trains.

The nearest airports are Diu And Keshod. Daily Flights connect Diu to Mumbai.

Lalit Tribhangi Temple
An important place of pushtimarg founded by shri vallabhacharya mahaprabhuji.
The deity Lalit Tribhangi is a swarup of lord Krishna, bending too much and playing flute.

Somnath Temple

Points of interests 

 Somnath
 Sasan Gir
 Prabhas Patan
 Bhalka
 Triveni Sangam

References

Port cities in India
Cities and towns in Gir Somnath district
Ports and harbours of Gujarat